Atopochilus mandevillei is a species of upside-down catfish endemic to the Democratic Republic of the Congo where it occurs in the Kinsuka Rapids.  This species grows to a length of  TL.

Etymology
The catfish is named in honor of J. Th. Mandeville, a fisheries agent working for the government of Leopoldville, now known as Kinshasa, Democratic Republic of the Congo, who collected some of the species paratype specimens.

References

mandevillei
Freshwater fish of Africa
Fish of the Democratic Republic of the Congo
Endemic fauna of the Democratic Republic of the Congo
Taxa named by Max Poll
Fish described in 1959